BCMS may stand for:
 Before Christ Men Serving
 Bala Cynwyd Middle School
 BCMS - M&A Advisors
 Bethlehem central middle School
 Bible Churchmen's Missionary Society
 British Cattle Movement Service
 Boyd County Middle School
 Bacton Community Middle School
 Business Continuity Management System
 Bosnian-Croatian-Montenegrin-Serbian, an alternative designation for the Serbo-Croatian language
 b.media Content Management System